Sampha Lahai Sisay (born 16 November 1988) is an English singer, songwriter, musician and record producer from Morden, South London. Sampha is widely known for his collaborative work with Kendrick Lamar, SBTRKT, Jessie Ware, Drake, Kanye West, Solange and others. Sampha has released two solo EPs: Sundanza (2010) and Dual (2013). Sampha's debut album, Process, was released on 3 February 2017 by Young and won the 2017 Mercury Prize.

Early years
Sampha was born in Morden, South London to Sierra Leonean parents who moved to the United Kingdom in the 1980s. His introduction to music began with learning to play on the piano at his parents' home in Morden and absorbing as it were records given to him by his older siblings. Later he discovered music production as a young teen, after his older brother, Sanie, built himself a makeshift home studio. He also went to Ewell Castle School for a number of years where he studied A-Level Music and in 2017 returned to open a new music studio building. In 2007 through Myspace.com, Sampha met London producer, Kwes, whose music Sampha said changed his life. Kwes guided him and made introductions to musicians, Mica "Micachu" Levi, Ghostpoet, DELS as well as his now label-home, Young. In 2009 Sampha interned at the label. Also through Young, Sampha was able to remix 'Basic Space' by The xx and meet his earliest collaborators: SBTRKT, Jessie Ware, Bullion and Lil Silva. Sampha is also the cousin of grime artist Flirta D from the grime music group SLK.

Discography

 Process (2017)

Awards and nominations

References

External links
 

1988 births
Living people
21st-century Black British male singers
English record producers
English soul singers
English people of Sierra Leonean descent
Singers from London
People from Morden
English male singer-songwriters
English electronic musicians
XL Recordings artists
British hip hop singers
British male singers